Holly Lee Ferling (born 22 December 1995) is an Australian professional cricketer who made her debut for the Australia national women's cricket team in 2013 and currently plays for the Perth Scorchers and Australian Capital Territory in Australia's domestic competitions. She is a right-arm fast-medium bowler and right-handed batter.

Cricket

A right-arm fast-medium paced bowler, Ferling made four appearances during the 2013 Women's Cricket World Cup, taking nine wickets at an average of 10.55; placing her second on the bowling averages tables. She was named as the twelfth player in the team of the tournament, selected by an ICC panel.

At the age of 14, Ferling made her debut in men's grade cricket in Queensland, and took a hat-trick with her first three balls. She later became the first woman to be named as the Queensland Junior Cricketer of the Year. Ferling developed her game playing alongside men, something she feels has helped her to teach her where to bowl.

In June 2015, she was named as one of Australia's touring party for the 2015 Women's Ashes in England, after a period of injury.

In July 2015, Ferling was named as the first signing for the Brisbane Heat in the inaugural Women's Big Bash League. She also played for Northern Districts Spirit in New Zealand during the 2015–16 season.

Ferling was dropped from the Australian squad in November 2016, and subsequently required surgery on an elbow injury that ruled her out of contention for a recall ahead of the 2017 World Cup.

In November 2018, she was named in the Melbourne Stars' squad for the 2018–19 Women's Big Bash League season. In August 2021, she joined their local rivals, the Melbourne Renegades.

Netball
Ferling was also an accomplished netball player. Predominantly known as a defensive player, she rose to represent the Wide Bay Thundercats in the Queensland State Netball League.

Media work
Ferling presents a podcast on women in sport called Girls & Glory, launched in 2020.

In January 2021, Ferling was a guest presenter on Channel Seven's coverage of the Fourth Test between Australia and India at The Gabba, with the regular commentary team unable to be present on the ground due to the COVID-19 pandemic. Her performance attracted widespread praise from viewers.

Personal life
Ferling's nickname is "Bambi". In 2015, she explained to The Saturday Paper: "It's because I fall over all the time."

References

Further reading

External links

 
 
 Holly Ferling at Cricket Australia
 

1995 births
Living people
Cricketers from Queensland
Australia women Test cricketers
Australia women One Day International cricketers
Australia women Twenty20 International cricketers
Queensland Fire cricketers
Northern Districts women cricketers
Brisbane Heat (WBBL) cricketers
Melbourne Stars (WBBL) cricketers
Melbourne Renegades (WBBL) cricketers
Perth Scorchers (WBBL) cricketers
ACT Meteors cricketers
People from Kingaroy
Australian women podcasters
Australian podcasters
Queensland state netball league players
Netball players from Queensland
Australian netball players